Allium carolinianum is a species of onions native to central and southern Asia (Xinjiang, Xizang (Tibet), Afghanistan, Bhutan, India, Kazakhstan, Kyrgyzstan, Nepal, Pakistan, Tajikistan, Uzbekistan). It grows in sunlit slopes at elevations of 3000–5000 m.

Allium carolinianum produces egg-shaped bulbs up to 25 mm across. Scapes are round in cross-section, up to 60 cm tall. Leaves are narrow, flat, shorter than the scape. Umbel is round,  with many white, red or purplish flowers.

References

External links
 

carolinianum
Onions
Flora of temperate Asia
Plants described in 1804